Uroš Mirković (born 8 August 1990) is a Serbian football midfielder for FK Radnički Pirot.

References

External links
 
 Uroš Mirković stats at utakmica.rs 
 

1990 births
Living people
People from Prokuplje
Association football midfielders
Serbian footballers
Serbian expatriate footballers
FK Bežanija players
FK Sopot players
OFK Mladenovac players
FK Sinđelić Beograd players
FK Donji Srem players
FK Radnik Surdulica players
FK Krupa players
FK Borac Banja Luka players
FK Radnički Pirot players
Serbian SuperLiga players
Serbian First League players
Premier League of Bosnia and Herzegovina players
Serbian expatriate sportspeople in Bosnia and Herzegovina
Expatriate footballers in Bosnia and Herzegovina